Parsac (Auvergnat: Parçac) is a former commune in the Creuse department in the Limousin region in central France. On 1 January 2016, it was merged into the new commune Parsac-Rimondeix.

Geography

Population

Sights
 The twelfth-century church.
 The remains of two feudal castles.
 An old stone bridge.
 The fifteenth-century tower.
 A twelfth-century chapel at La Madeleine

See also
Communes of the Creuse department

References

Former communes of Creuse
Populated places disestablished in 2016